Ilnur Garipov (born 14 March 2000) is a Russian Paralympic swimmer. He represented Russian Paralympic Committee athletes at the 2020 Summer Paralympics.

Paralympics
Garipov represented Russian Paralympic Committee athletes at the 2020 Summer Paralympics and won a gold medal in the mixed 4 × 100 metre freestyle relay 49pts event.

References

2000 births
Living people
Paralympic swimmers of Russia
Swimmers at the 2020 Summer Paralympics
Medalists at the 2020 Summer Paralympics
Paralympic medalists in swimming
Paralympic gold medalists for the Russian Paralympic Committee athletes
Russian male freestyle swimmers
S11-classified Paralympic swimmers
21st-century Russian people